Frank Wesley Humphrey (1851–1931) was a member of the Wisconsin State Assembly.

Biography
Humphrey was born on November 7, 1851 in Lima, Sheboygan County, Wisconsin. In 1881, Humphrey graduated from Lawrence University. He settled in Shawano, Wisconsin the following year, where he became a banker. He died there on July 15, 1931.

Assembly career
Humphrey was a Republican member of the Assembly during the 1899 session.

References

1851 births
1931 deaths
American bankers
Lawrence University alumni
Republican Party members of the Wisconsin State Assembly
People from Lima, Sheboygan County, Wisconsin
People from Shawano, Wisconsin